Delicious Way (stylized in all lowercase) is the debut album by Japanese recording artist Mai Kuraki. It was released by Giza Studio and Giza Inc. in Japan on June 28, 2000. The album was entirely co-written by Kuraki herself, with the help of Michael Africk and Yoko Blaqstone in some tracks, while production was handled by Kanonji. The album's background and development started in mid-to-late 1999 after her American debut single "Baby I Like", where East West Records and Giza Studio sent her back to Japan. To promote the album, four singles were released; "Love, Day After Tomorrow" (which sold over 1.3 million units in Japan), "Stay by My Side", "Secret of My Heart", and "Never Gonna Give You Up".

Musically, Delicious Way is a R&B album with influences of 1980s-inspired pop, hip-hop, and soul music. Upon its release, the album received positive reviews from music critics. They commended the composition and her songwriting skills, and a few critics selected the singles as some of the best material in the record. Commercially, the album was a huge success in Japan, peaking at number one on the Oricon Albums Chart. It was the second highest selling album based on first week sales for a solo artist at the time, and sold over 3.5 million units in Japan, making it the ninth best selling album in that region. The success of the album garnered Kuraki the Japan Gold Disc Award for "Rock Album of the Year".

Background and composition
While in high school in Japan, Kuraki sent a demo tape of songs to Giza Studio, who then signed her to their label. However, Giza Studio sent Kuraki to the United States to enter that region, which later attributed to her debut single "Baby I Like". The track impressed executives at East West Records, prompting the label to distribute it. However, it failed to chart on any Billboard chart there. There onward, Giza Studio's enlisted Kanonji to produce her debut record whilst Kuraki served as the album's primary songwriter, with the help of Michael Africk on the tracks "Baby Tonight (You & Me)" and "Never Gonna Give You Up", and Yoko Blaqstone with the track "Can't Get Enough (Gimme Your Love)". The record label also hired American engineers Cybersound to arrange and mix majority of the songs from Delicious Way, with the help of Stone. Delicious Way  was not engineered in North America, unlike most of Cybersound's work.

The composition of the album's music included Aika Ohno, Stone, Tomoo Kasahara, Miguel Sá Pessoa, Perry Geyer at Cybersound, Masataka Kitaura, and Africk. Musically, Delicious Way is an R&B album with influences of pop music, as described by a staff member from CD Journal. A majority of the album's lyrics include small English language sentences, whilst the tracks "Baby Tonight (You & Me)", "Never Gonna Give You Up", and "Can't Get Enough (Gimme Your Love)" are English-prominent written tracks.

Release and promotion
Delicious Way  was released by Giza Studio and Giza Inc. in Japan on June 28, 2000. The album contains 11 tracks in both physical and digital formats, and has a cover sleeve photographed by Miho Mori; it features a slightly-sepia tinted image of Mai Kuraki, in front of a blurry background. To promote the album, four singles were released. The first single was "Love, Day After Tomorrow", released on December 8, 1999. It was a success in Japan, reaching number two and 63 on the Oricon Singles Chart and Japan Hot 100 chart. It was certified in two categories by the Recording Industry Association of Japan (RIAJ) and sold over 1.3 million physical units and 100,000 digital sales in that region.

The second single was "Stay by My Side", released on March 15, 2000. The single sold nearly one million units in Japan, and became her first single to reach the top spot on the Oricon Singles Chart in Japan. It was certified double platinum by the RIAJ for shipments of 800,000 units. "Secret of My Heart", the album's third single, was released on April 26, 2000. It managed to reach number two on the Oricon Singles Chart, but was certified Million by the RIAJ for physical shipments of one million units; it has sold 968,980 physical units, and 100,000 digital copies in that region. The album's final single was "Never Gonna Give You Up", which was released on June 7, 2000. Despite selling 434,250 units in Japan, the lowest sales count for a single on Delicious Way, it managed to reach number two on the Oricon Singles Chart was received a Platinum certification by the RIAJ.

Reception and legacy

Upon its release, Delicious Way received favorable reviews from most music critics. A staff member from CD Journal enjoyed the album, but pointed out "Stepping Out", "Can't Get Enough (Gimme Your Love)", "Everything's All Right", "Happy Days", and "Kimi to no Jikan" as the album's best tracks. Retrospectively, Alexey Eremenko, who contributed in writing the biography of Kuraki at AllMusic, highlighted the album songs "Delicious Way", "Love, Day After Tomorrow", "Never Gonna Give You Up", and "Secret of My Heart", as some of her greatest work. At the 15th Japan Gold Disc Awards in 2001, Delicious Way won the award for "Best Rock Album of the Year". Alongside this, her single "Secret of My Heart" received the "Song of the Year" award, amongst 13 other recipients.

The album was a huge success in Japan. It debuted at number one on the Oricon Albums Chart with 2,218,640 units sold, making it the highest first week sales for a debut album in Japanese music history and sixth overall. It stayed at the top for two consecutive weeks and remained in the top 10 for nine consecutive weeks. By the end of 2000, Delicious Way sold 3.45 million units in Japan, making it the highest selling album of the year. As of July 2016, Delicious Way has sold over 3.5 million units in Japan, making it the 9th best selling album in Japan of all time. Alongside this achievement, it is the third best selling debut album, behind Globe's self-titled album and Hikaru Utada's First Love), and is the fourth highest selling studio album by a female artist. Eremenko stated that the album's sales were a milestone in Japan, but commented "Kuraki never topped these results (both singles and album), but neither did she fizzle out after the debut."

In 2015, Kuraki paid tribute to the album by re-creating the artwork for her greatest hits compilation Mai Kuraki Best 151A: Love & Hope; Arama Japan staff members commented she "recreat[ed] the iconic fresh faced and plain clothed cover with her calm facial expression." According to their staff, the recording is a classic and helped the singer defining "her spot in the Japanese music industry."

Track listing

Personnel
Credits adapted from the CD liner notes of Delicious Way.

Mai Kuraki – vocals, backing vocals, songwriting
Aika Ohno – composer. backing vocals
Cybersound – tracking, arranging, mixing
Yoko Blaqstone – composer. backing vocals, tracking, arranging
Michael Africk – backing vocals, tracking, arranging, composer. songwriting
Miguel Sá Pessoa – composer. tracking, mixing
Perry Geyer – composer. tracking, recording
Masatake Kitaura – composing
Tomoo Kasahara – composing
Gan Kojima – art direction
Tokiko Nishimuro – direction

Yasuko Yamamoto – co-direction
Akio Nakajima – mixing, recording
Takayuki Ichikawa – mixing, recording
DJ Dopejack – musician
Greg Hawkes – musician
Larry Thomas – musician
Miho Mori – photography
Kanonji – producer, executive producer
Katsuyuki Yoshimatsu – recording
Sawako Ryuko – mixing
Shigeru Kajita – mixing

Charts

Weekly charts

Yearly charts

All-time charts

Certification and sales

Release history

See also
Mai Kuraki discography
List of Oricon number-one albums of 1999
Lists of fastest-selling albums
List of best-selling albums in Japan

Notes

References

External links 
Delicious Way at Mai Kuraki's official website. 

2000 debut albums
Mai Kuraki albums
Giza Studio albums
Being Inc. albums
Japanese-language albums
Albums produced by Daiko Nagato